Tekolďany is a village and municipality in Hlohovec District in the Trnava Region of western Slovakia.

History
In historical records the village was first mentioned in 1310.

Geography
It has a population of about 165 people.

References

External links
http://www.statistics.sk/mosmis/eng/run.html

Villages and municipalities in Hlohovec District